Farsiyeh may refer to:
 Farsiyeh, Ahvaz, Khuzestan Province
 Farsiyeh, Shushtar, Khuzestan Province
 Farsiyeh 2, Khuzestan Province
 Farsiyeh, Razavi Khorasan